Lee Nunatak is a nunatak,  high,  northwest of Penseroso Bluff in the northwest part of the Daniels Range in the Usarp Mountains of Antarctica. It was mapped by the United States Geological Survey from surveys and U.S. Navy air photos, 1960–63, and was named by the Advisory Committee on Antarctic Names for Chun Chi Lee, a United States Antarctic Research Program biologist at McMurdo Station, 1967–68.

References

Nunataks of Oates Land